The 1986–87 season was the 85th season in which Dundee competed at a Scottish national level, playing in the Scottish Premier Division. Dundee would finish in 6th place for the third consecutive season. Dundee would also compete in both the Scottish League Cup and the Scottish Cup, where they were knocked out in the League Cup by Rangers in the quarter-finals, and by inter-city rivals Dundee United in the semi-finals of the Scottish Cup.

Scottish Premier Division 

Statistics provided by Dee Archive.

League table

Scottish League Cup 

Statistics provided by Dee Archive.

Scottish Cup 

Statistics provided by Dee Archive.

Player statistics 
Statistics provided by Dee Archive

|}

See also 

 List of Dundee F.C. seasons

References

External links 

 1986–87 Dundee season on Fitbastats

Dundee F.C. seasons
Dundee